John Scott (born 1928) was a Canadian ice hockey player with the East York Lyndhursts. He won a silver medal at the 1954 World Ice Hockey Championships in Stockholm, Sweden. He also played for the Ayr Raiders in Ayr, Scotland.

References

1928 births
Living people
Canadian ice hockey right wingers
East York Lyndhursts players